The canton of Saint-Max is an administrative division of the Meurthe-et-Moselle department, northeastern France. Its borders were modified at the French canton reorganisation which came into effect in March 2015. Its seat is in Saint-Max.

It consists of the following communes:
Dommartemont
Essey-lès-Nancy
Malzéville
Saint-Max
Tomblaine

References

Cantons of Meurthe-et-Moselle